Love, Sex, and the Zodiac  is an album by jazz saxophonist Cannonball Adderley recorded in Berkeley, California in 1970, but not released on the Fantasy label until 1974, featuring performances by Adderley's Quintet featuring Nat Adderley, Hal Galper, Walter Booker and Roy McCurdy with guest appearances by George Duke and Jimmy Jones and narration by Los Angeles DJ Rick Holmes.

Reception
The Allmusic review awarded the album 1 star, stating that "The end result is too frivolous to find favor with those who take astrology seriously, yet too serious-minded to be nearly as funny as intentional parodies of self-helpish narratives".

Track listing
 "Introduction" (Hal Galper) -
 "Aries: Damn Right" (George Duke) -
 "Taurus: Wampus Cat" (Walter Booker) -
 "Gemini: Ecstasy" (Julian "Cannonball" Adderley, Jimmy  Jones) -
 "Cancer: All Sides" (Nat Adderley) -
 "Leo: Rosebud" (Galper) -
 "Virgo: For Pam" (Galper) -
 "Libra: Patricia" (Roy McCurdy) -
 "Scorpio: Back "A" Town (Nat Adderley) -
 "Sagittarius: West Texas" (Nat Adderley) -
 "Capricorn: The Gentle" (Nat Adderley) -
 "Aquarius: Humanity Plus" (Julian "Cannoball" Adderley, Nat Adderley) -
 "Pisces: Allison's Trip" (Nat Adderley) -
Recorded in Berkeley, CA in 1970

Personnel
Cannonball Adderley - alto saxophone
Nat Adderley - cornet
Hal Galper - electric piano
Walter Booker - bass
Roy McCurdy - drums
George Duke - clavinet, ARP synthesizer
Jimmy Jones - piano
Rick Holmes - narration

References

1974 albums
Fantasy Records albums
Cannonball Adderley albums
Albums produced by David Axelrod (musician)
Concept albums